The cerebrospinal system may refer to:
Cerebrospinal venous system
Ventricular system of cerebrospinal fluid